Ferrocene is an organometallic compound with the formula . The molecule is a complex consisting of two cyclopentadienyl rings bound to a central iron atom. It is an orange solid with a camphor-like odor, that sublimes above room temperature, and is soluble in most organic solvents.  It is remarkable for its stability: it is unaffected by air, water, strong bases, and can be heated to 400 °C without decomposition.  In oxidizing conditions it can reversibly react with strong acids to form the ferrocenium cation .

The rapid growth of organometallic chemistry is often attributed to the excitement arising from the discovery of ferrocene and its many analogues, such as metallocenes.

History

Discovery
Ferrocene was discovered by accident twice. The first known synthesis may have been made in the late 1940s by unknown researchers at Union Carbide, who tried to pass hot cyclopentadiene vapor through an iron pipe.  The vapor reacted with the pipe wall, creating a "yellow sludge" that clogged the pipe.  Years later, a sample of the sludge that had been saved was obtained and analyzed by E. Brimm, shortly after reading Kealy and Pauson's article, and was found to consist of ferrocene.

The second time was around 1950, when S. Miller, J. Tebboth, and J. Tremaine, researchers at British Oxygen, were attempting to synthesize amines from hydrocarbons and nitrogen in a modification of the Haber process.  When they tried to react cyclopentadiene with nitrogen at 300 °C, at atmospheric pressure, they were disappointed to see the hydrocarbon react with some source of iron, yielding ferrocene.  While they too observed its remarkable stability, they put the observation aside and did not publish it until after Pauson reported his findings.  In fact, Kealy and Pauson were provided with a sample by Miller et al., who confirmed that the products were the same compound.

In 1951, Peter L. Pauson and Thomas J. Kealy at Duquesne University attempted to prepare fulvalene by oxidative dimerization of cyclopentadiene.  To that end, they reacted the Grignard compound cyclopentadienyl magnesium bromide in diethyl ether with ferric chloride as an oxidizer. However, instead of the expected fulvalene, they obtained a light orange powder of "remarkable stability", with the formula .

Determining the structure

Pauson and Kealy conjectured that the compound had two cyclopentadienyl groups, each with a single covalent bond from the saturated carbon atom to the iron atom. However, that structure was inconsistent with then-existing bonding models and did not explain the unexpected stability of the compound, and chemists struggled to find the correct structure.

The structure was deduced and reported independently by three groups in 1952:
Woodward and Wilkinson deduced it by observing that ferrocene underwent reactions typical of aromatic compounds such as benzene
E. Fischer  deduced the structure (which he called "double cone") and also synthesized other metallocenes such as nickelocene and cobaltocene.
P. F. Eiland and R. Pepinsky confirmed the structure through X-ray crystallography and later by NMR.

Understanding the structure
The "sandwich" structure of ferrocene was shockingly novel, and required new theory to explain.  Application of molecular orbital theory with the assumption of a  Fe2+ centre between two cyclopentadienide anions  resulted in the successful Dewar–Chatt–Duncanson model, allowing correct prediction of the geometry of the molecule as well as explaining its remarkable stability.

Impact
Ferrocene was not the first organometallic compound to be discovered. Zeise's salt  was reported in 1831, Edward Frankland synthesized diethylzinc and other similar compounds in 1848, Mond's discovery of Ni(CO)4 occurred in 1888, and organolithium compounds were developed in the 1930s.  However, it can be argued that it was ferrocene's discovery that began organometallic chemistry as a separate area of chemistry.  It also led to an explosion of interest in compounds of d-block metals with hydrocarbons.

The discovery was considered so significant that Wilkinson and Fischer shared the 1973 Nobel Prize for Chemistry "for their pioneering work, performed independently, on the chemistry of the organometallic, so called sandwich compounds".

Structure and bonding
Mössbauer spectroscopy indicates that the iron center in ferrocene should be assigned the +2 oxidation state. Each cyclopentadienyl (Cp) ring should then be allocated a single negative charge.  Thus ferrocene could be described as iron(II) bis(cyclopentadienide), .

The number of π-electrons on each ring is then six, which makes it aromatic according to Hückel's rule. These twelve π-electrons are then shared with the metal via covalent bonding. Since Fe2+ has six d-electrons, the complex attains an 18-electron configuration, which accounts for its stability.

The carbon–carbon bond distances around each five-membered ring are all 1.40 Å, and the Fe–C bond distances are all 2.04 Å. From room temperature down to 164K, X-ray crystallography yields the monoclinic space group; the cyclopentadienide rings are a staggered conformation, resulting in a centrosymmetric molecule, with symmetry group D5d.  However, below 110 K, ferrocene crystallizes in an orthorhombic crystal lattice in which the Cp rings are ordered and eclipsed, so that the molecule has symmetry group D5h.  In the gas phase, electron diffraction and computational studies show that the Cp rings are eclipsed.

The Cp rings rotate with a low barrier about the Cp(centroid)–Fe–Cp(centroid) axis, as observed by measurements on substituted derivatives of ferrocene using 1H and 13C nuclear magnetic resonance spectroscopy.  For example, methylferrocene (CH3C5H4FeC5H5) exhibits a singlet for the C5H5 ring.

In solution, and at room temperature, eclipsed D5h ferrocene was determined to dominate over the staggered D5d conformer, as suggested by both Fourier-transform infrared spectroscopy and DFT calculations.

Synthesis

Industrial synthesis
Industrially, ferrocene is synthesized by the reaction of iron(II) ethoxide with cyclopentadiene; the iron(II) ethoxide needed is produced by the electrochemical oxidation of metallic iron in anhydrous ethanol. Since the reaction between iron(II) ethoxide and cyclopentadiene produces ethanol as a byproduct, the ethanol effectively serves as a catalyst for the overall reaction, with the net reaction being Fe + 2C5H6 → H2 + Fe(C5H5)2 (also see below)

Via Grignard reagent
The first reported syntheses of ferrocene were nearly simultaneous.  Pauson and Kealy synthesised ferrocene using iron(III) chloride and a Grignard reagent, cyclopentadienyl magnesium bromide.  Iron(III) chloride is suspended in anhydrous diethyl ether and added to the Grignard reagent.  A redox reaction occurs, forming the cyclopentadienyl radical and iron(II) ions.  Dihydrofulvalene is produced by radical-radical recombination while the iron(II) reacts with the Grignard reagent to form ferrocene.  Oxidation of dihydrofulvalene to fulvalene with iron(III), the outcome sought by Kealy and Pauson, does not occur.

Gas-metal reaction

The other early synthesis of ferrocene was by Miller et al., who reacted metallic iron directly with gas-phase cyclopentadiene at elevated temperature.  An approach using iron pentacarbonyl was also reported.

Fe(CO)5 + 2 C5H6(g) → Fe(C5H5)2 + 5 CO(g) + H2(g)

Via alkali cyclopentadienide
More efficient preparative methods are generally a modification of the original transmetalation sequence using either commercially available sodium cyclopentadienide or freshly cracked cyclopentadiene deprotonated with potassium hydroxide and reacted with anhydrous iron(II) chloride in ethereal solvents.

Modern modifications of Pauson and Kealy's original Grignard approach are known:

Using sodium cyclopentadienide:       2 NaC5H5   +   FeCl2   →   Fe(C5H5)2   +   2 NaCl
Using freshly-cracked cyclopentadiene:     FeCl2·4H2O   +   2 C5H6   +   2 KOH   →   Fe(C5H5)2   +   2 KCl   +   6 H2O
Using an iron(II) salt with a Grignard reagent:     2 C5H5MgBr   +   FeCl2   →   Fe(C5H5)2   +   2 MgBrCl

Even some amine bases (such as diethylamine) can be used for the deprotonation, though the reaction proceeds more slowly than when using stronger bases:

2 C5H6   +   2 (CH3CH2)2NH   +   FeCl2   →   Fe(C5H5)2   +   2 (CH3CH2)2NH2Cl

Direct transmetalation can also be used to prepare ferrocene from other metallocenes, such as manganocene:

FeCl2   +   Mn(C5H5)2   →   MnCl2   +   Fe(C5H5)2

Properties

Ferrocene is an air-stable orange solid with a camphor-like odor.  As expected for a symmetric, uncharged species, ferrocene is soluble in normal organic solvents, such as benzene, but is insoluble in water. It is stable to temperatures as high as 400 °C.

Ferrocene readily sublimes, especially upon heating in a vacuum.  Its vapor pressure is about 1 Pa at 25 °C, 10 Pa at 50 °C, 100 Pa at 80 °C, 1000 Pa at 116 °C, and 10,000 Pa (nearly 0.1 atm) at 162 °C.

Reactions

With electrophiles
Ferrocene undergoes many reactions characteristic of aromatic compounds, enabling the preparation of substituted derivatives. A common undergraduate experiment is the Friedel–Crafts reaction of ferrocene with acetic anhydride (or acetyl chloride) in the presence of phosphoric acid as a catalyst. Under conditions for a Mannich reaction, ferrocene gives N,N-dimethylaminomethylferrocene.

Protonation of ferrocene allows isolation of [Cp2FeH]PF6.

In the presence of aluminium chloride Me2NPCl2 and ferrocene react to give ferrocenyl dichlorophosphine, whereas treatment with phenyldichlorophosphine under similar conditions forms P,P-diferrocenyl-P-phenyl phosphine.

Ferrocene reacts with P4S10 forms a diferrocenyl-dithiadiphosphetane disulfide.

Lithiation
Ferrocene reacts with butyllithium to give 1,1′-dilithioferrocene, which is a versatile nucleophile. In combination with butyllithiium,  tert-butyllithium produces monolithioferrocene.

Redox chemistry 
Ferrocene undergoes a one-electron oxidation at around 0.4 V versus a saturated calomel electrode (SCE), becoming ferrocenium. This reversible oxidation has been used as standard in electrochemistry as Fc+/Fc = 0.64 V versus the standard hydrogen electrode, however other values have been reported. Ferrocenium tetrafluoroborate is a common reagent. The remarkably reversible oxidation-reduction behaviour has been extensively used to control electron-transfer processes in electrochemical and photochemical systems. 

Substituents on the cyclopentadienyl ligands alters the redox potential in the expected way: electron-withdrawing groups such as a carboxylic acid shift the potential in the anodic direction (i.e. made more positive), whereas electron-releasing groups such as methyl groups shift the potential in the cathodic direction (more negative). Thus, decamethylferrocene is much more easily oxidised than ferrocene and can even be oxidised to the corresponding dication. Ferrocene is often used as an internal standard for calibrating redox potentials in non-aqueous electrochemistry.

Stereochemistry of substituted ferrocenes

Disubstituted ferrocenes can exist as either 1,2-, 1,3- or 1,1′- isomers, none of which are interconvertible. Ferrocenes that are asymmetrically disubstituted on one ring are chiral – for example [CpFe(EtC5H3Me)]. This planar chirality arises despite no single atom being a stereogenic centre. The substituted ferrocene shown at right (a 4-(dimethylamino)pyridine derivative) has been shown to be effective when used for the kinetic resolution of racemic secondary alcohols.
Several approaches have been developed to asymmetrically 1,1′-functionalise the ferrocene.

Applications of ferrocene and its derivatives
Ferrocene and its numerous derivatives have no large-scale applications, but have many niche uses that exploit the unusual structure (ligand scaffolds, pharmaceutical candidates), robustness (anti-knock formulations, precursors to materials), and redox (reagents and redox standards).

Ligand scaffolds
Chiral ferrocenyl phosphines are employed as ligands for transition-metal catalyzed reactions. Some of them have found industrial applications in the synthesis of pharmaceuticals and agrochemicals. For example, the diphosphine 1,1′-bis(diphenylphosphino)ferrocene (dppf) is a valued ligand for palladium-coupling reactions and Josiphos ligand is useful for hydrogenation catalysis. They are named after the technician who made the first one, Josi Puleo.

Fuel additives
Ferrocene and its derivatives are antiknock agents used in the fuel for petrol engines. They are safer than previously used tetraethyllead. Petrol additive solutions containing ferrocene can be added to unleaded petrol to enable its use in vintage cars designed to run on leaded petrol. The iron-containing deposits formed from ferrocene can form a conductive coating on spark plug surfaces. Ferrocene polyglycol copolymers, prepared by effecting a polycondensation reaction between a ferrocene derivative and a substituted dihydroxy alcohol, has promise as a component of rocket propellants. These copolymers provide rocket propellants with heat stability, serving as a propellant binder and controlling propellant burn rate.

Ferrocene has been found to be effective at reducing smoke and sulfur trioxide produced when burning coal. The addition by any practical means, impregnating the coal or adding ferrocene to the combustion chamber, can significantly reduce the amount of these undesirable byproducts, even with a small amount of the metal cyclopentadienyl compound.

Pharmaceuticals
Ferrocene derivatives have been investigated as drugs, with one compound ferrocerone approved for use in the USSR in the 1970s, though it is no longer marketed today. Only one drug has entered clinical trials in recent years, Ferroquine (7-chloro-N-(2-((dimethylamino)methyl)ferrocenyl)quinolin-4-amine), an antimalarial, which has reached Phase IIb trials. Ferrocene-containing polymer-based drug delivery systems have been investigated.

The anticancer activity of ferrocene derivatives was first investigated in the late 1970s, when derivatives bearing amine or amide groups were tested against lymphocytic leukemia. Some ferrocenium salts exhibit anticancer activity, but no compound has seen evaluation in the clinic.  Ferrocene derivatives have strong inhibitory activity against human lung cancer cell line A549, colorectal cancer cell line HCT116, and breast cancer cell line MCF-7. An experimental drug was reported which is a ferrocenyl version of tamoxifen.  The idea is that the tamoxifen will bind to the estrogen binding sites, resulting in cytotoxicity.

Ferrocifens are exploited for cancer applications by a French biotech, Feroscan, founded by Pr. Gerard Jaouen.

Solid rocket propellant 
Ferrocene and related derivatives are used as powerful burn rate catalysts in ammonium perchlorate composite propellant.

Derivatives and variations
Ferrocene analogues can be prepared with variants of cyclopentadienyl. For example, bisindenyliron and bisfluorenyliron.

Carbon atoms can be replaced by heteroatoms as illustrated by Fe(η5-C5Me5)(η5-P5) and Fe(η5-C5H5)(η5-C4H4N) ("azaferrocene"). Azaferrocene arises from decarbonylation of Fe(η5-C5H5)(CO)2(η1-pyrrole) in cyclohexane. This compound on boiling under reflux in benzene is converted to ferrocene.

Because of the ease of substitution, many structurally unusual ferrocene derivatives have been prepared. For example, the penta(ferrocenyl)cyclopentadienyl ligand, features a cyclopentadienyl anion derivatized with five ferrocene substituents.

In hexaferrocenylbenzene, C6[(η5-C5H4)Fe(η5-C5H5)]6, all six positions on a benzene molecule have ferrocenyl substituents (R). X-ray diffraction analysis of this compound confirms that the cyclopentadienyl ligands are not co-planar with the benzene core but have alternating dihedral angles of +30° and −80°. Due to steric crowding the ferrocenyls are slightly bent with angles of 177° and have elongated C-Fe bonds. The quaternary cyclopentadienyl carbon atoms are also pyramidalized. Also, the benzene core has a chair conformation with dihedral angles of 14° and displays bond length alternation between 142.7 pm and 141.1 pm, both indications of steric crowding of the substituents.

The synthesis of hexaferrocenylbenzene has been reported using Negishi coupling of hexaiodidobenzene and diferrocenylzinc, using tris(dibenzylideneacetone)dipalladium(0) as catalyst, in tetrahydrofuran:

The yield is only 4%, which is further evidence consistent with substantial steric crowding around the arene core.

Materials chemistry
 
Ferrocene, a precursor to iron nanoparticles, can be used as a catalyst for the production of carbon nanotubes. The vinylferrocene can be made by a Wittig reaction of the aldehyde, a phosphonium salt, and sodium hydroxide. The vinyl ferrocene can be converted into a polymer (polyvinylferrocene, PVFc), a ferrocenyl version of polystyrene (the phenyl groups are replaced with ferrocenyl groups). Another polyferrocene which can be formed is poly(2-(methacryloyloxy)ethyl ferrocenecarboxylate), PFcMA.  In addition to using organic polymer backbones, these pendant ferrocene units have been attached to inorganic backbones such as polysiloxanes, polyphosphazenes, and polyphosphinoboranes, (–PH(R)–BH2–)n, and the resulting materials exhibit unusual physical and electronic properties relating to the ferrocene / ferrocinium redox couple.  Both PVFc and PFcMA have been tethered onto silica wafers and the wettability measured when the polymer chains are uncharged and when the ferrocene moieties are oxidised to produce positively charged groups.  The contact angle with water on the PFcMA-coated wafers was 70° smaller following oxidation, while in the case of PVFc the decrease was 30°, and the switching of wettability is reversible.  In the PFcMA case, the effect of lengthening the chains and hence introducing more ferrocene groups is significantly larger reductions in the contact angle upon oxidation.

See also 
 Josiphos ligands

References

External links 

Ferrocene at The Periodic Table of Videos (University of Nottingham)
NIOSH Pocket Guide to Chemical Hazards (Centers for Disease Control and Prevention)

 
Antiknock agents
Sandwich compounds
Cyclopentadienyl complexes
Substances discovered in the 1950s